Alberto Pinto (1943–2012) was a photographer and interior designer based in Paris.  He designed the interiors of apartments, corporations, hotels, yachts, and jets. He had a home collection of his own and collaborated with many manufacturers, such as Raynaud and Pierre Frey.

History
Alberto Pinto was born in Casablanca to Moroccan Sephardic Jewish parents.  He attended Ecole de Louvre in Paris and then moved to New York to start a photography agency.  His photography agency specialized in decoration and interior design. This focus on design led Pinto to take up interior design almost four decades ago.

The seventeenth century private residence at the Place des Victoires in Paris was the home of Pinto's interior design and decoration agency.  The agency consisted of 60 people who worked on the design of large scale and atypical places, such as private residences, corporations, hotels, yachts, and private jets.  Notable projects include the Oceanco's Yacht Y708 and the Seaside Hotel Palm Beach, in Maspalomas.

In addition to interior design, Pinto had his own home collection, complete with furniture, tableware, table linen, and home accessories.  Pinto also collaborated with many home and tabletop manufacturers such as Raynaud, Pierre Frey, THG, Ercuis, Aït Manos, and D. Porthault.

Publications
 Alberto Pinto Michel Aveline Editions 1992 
 Alberto Pinto Classics Flammarion Editions 2001 
 Alberto Pinto Moderns Flammarion Editions 2002 
 Alberto Pinto Orientalism Flammarion Editions 2004 
 Alberto Pinto Bedrooms Flammarion Editions 2005  
 Alberto Pinto Corporate Flammarion Editions 2006 
 Alberto Pinto: Table Settings Rizzoli 2010 
 Alberto Pinto Today Flammarion 2011 
 Alberto Pinto: World Interiors (Architecture in Focus) Flammarion 2011

References

French photographers
French interior designers
2012 deaths
Moroccan emigrants to France
20th-century Moroccan Jews
1943 births